The 2014 Sun Devils football team represented Arizona State University in the 2014 NCAA Division I FBS football season. They were led by third-year head coach Todd Graham and played their home games at Sun Devil Stadium. They were a member of the South Division of the Pac-12 Conference. The Sun Devils finished the season 10–3 (6–3 in Pac-12 play) with a 36–31 victory over Duke in the Sun Bowl. It marked the first time since 1973 that Arizona State won ten or more games in back-to-back seasons.

Personnel

Coaching staff

Previous season

The 2013 Sun Devils finished 10–4 (8–1 in the Pac-12) and made an appearance in the Pac-12 Championship Game, where they were defeated by Stanford. They were invited to the Holiday Bowl, where they were upset by Texas Tech. It was the first time the Sun Devils won 10 games and finished ranked since the 2007 season.

Players drafted

Reference:

Schedule

Reference:

Game summaries

Weber State

New Mexico

Colorado

UCLA

USC

1st quarter scoring: USC – Nelson Agholor 53-yard punt return (Andre Heidari kick)

2nd quarter scoring: AS – Jaelen Strong 4-yard pass from Mike Bercovici (Alex Garoutte kick); AS – Strong 77-yard pass from Bercovici (Kody Kohl pass from Bercovici); USC – Javorius Allen 1-yard run (Heidari kick); USC – Heidari 35-yard field goal

3rd quarter scoring: AS – Garoutte 19-yard field goal; USC – Heidari 33-yard field goal

4th quarter scoring: USC – Cody Kessler 8-yard run (Heidari kick); AS – D. J. Foster 21-yard pass from Bercovici (Garoutte kick); USC – Allen 53-yard run (Heidari kick); AS – Cameron Smith 73-yard pass from Bercovici (Garoutte kick); AS – Strong 46-yard pass from Bercovici

Stanford

Washington

Utah

Notre Dame

The Sun Devils played their biggest game in the Todd Graham era against highly ranked Notre Dame, a game that many analysts viewed as an elimination game for a spot in the first-ever College Football Playoff. ASU stormed out of the gates leading 34–3 late in the first half, and although the Irish managed to cut the lead to 3 in the fourth quarter, the Sun Devils pulled away and secured a 55–31 victory. With the win, ASU moved into the top-10 for the first time since the 2007 season.

Oregon State

Washington State

Arizona

Duke (Sun Bowl)

Roster
The 2014 team roster can be viewed here

Rankings

Offseason

Players Drafted

Reference:

References

Arizona State
Arizona State Sun Devils football seasons
Sun Bowl champion seasons
Arizona State Sun Devils football